Mary Anne Marchino (January 27, 1938 – January 29, 2021) was an American competition swimmer who represented the United States at the 1956 Summer Olympics in Melbourne, Australia.  Marchino competed in the qualifying heats of the women's 100-meter backstroke, and she posted a time of 1:16.2.

References

1938 births
2021 deaths
American female freestyle swimmers
Olympic swimmers of the United States
Swimmers from Indianapolis
Swimmers at the 1956 Summer Olympics
21st-century American women